Deurali  is a village development committee in Nawalpur District in Gandaki Province of southern Nepal. At the time of the 1991 Nepal census it had a population of 10,537 people living in 1627 individual households.

References

Populated places in Nawalpur District